The Men's 4 × 400 m relay T35-38 for athletes with cerebral palsy at the 2004 Summer Paralympics was held in the Athens Olympic Stadium on 27 September. The event consisted of a single race, and was won by the team representing .

Final round

27 Sept. 2004, 11:25

Team Lists

References

M